"Smoking Gun" is a 1986 song by Robert Cray. It reached No. 2 on the Billboard Album Rock Tracks chart and No. 22 on the Billboard Hot 100. In addition, Cray was nominated for the 1987 MTV Video Music Award for Best New Artist in a Video for this song.

Background
The song deals with infidelity.

Critical reception
Ed Hogan of AllMusic remarked that the song contained "an arresting, up-tempo groove" which "ushered in the contemporary blues era with its respectful nod to the blues tradition while imparting the genre with an underlying airiness".

References

1986 songs
1986 debut singles
Songs written by Bruce Bromberg
Songs written by Robert Cray
Mercury Records singles